Volsdalen Church is a parish church of the Church of Norway in Ålesund Municipality in Møre og Romsdal county, Norway. It is located on the south side of the island of Nørvøya in the town of Ålesund. It is the church for the Volsdalen parish which is part of the Nordre Sunnmøre prosti (deanery) in the Diocese of Møre. The red, wooden church was built in a rectangular design in 1974 using plans drawn up by the architect Leif Olav Moen. The church seats about 500 people.

History
In 1957, planning began for a church for Volsdalen area to the east of the city centre of Ålesund. An architectural competition for the design of the new church was won by Leif Olav Moen. Construction for a new church was delayed due to a lack of funding. An interim church building was consecrated in 1964 for temporary use. In 1965, the Volsdalen area was separated from the Ålesund Church parish and it was established as a new parish of Volsdalen. In the 1970s, the builder and seafaring priest Bjørn Siem accelerated matters. He reworked the drawings to reduce costs, and a lot of volunteer work was done to construct the new church. The building was completed in 1974 and it was consecrated on 19 May 1974.

Media gallery

See also
List of churches in Møre

References

Buildings and structures in Ålesund
Churches in Møre og Romsdal
Rectangular churches in Norway
Wooden churches in Norway
20th-century Church of Norway church buildings
Churches completed in 1974
1964 establishments in Norway